Thermal depolymerization (TDP) is the process of converting a polymer into a monomer or a mixture of monomers, by predominantly thermal means. It may be catalysed or un-catalysed and is distinct from other forms of depolymerisation which may rely on the use of chemicals or biological action. This process is associated with an increase in entropy.

For most polymers thermal depolymerisation is chaotic process, giving a mixture of volatile compounds. Materials may be depolymerised in this way during waste management, with the volatile components produced being burnt as a form of synthetic fuel in a waste-to-energy process. For other polymers thermal depolymerisation is an ordered process giving a single product, or limited range of products, these transformations are usually more valuable and form the basis of some plastic recycling technologies.

Disordered depolymerisation
For most polymeric materials thermal depolymerisation proceeds in a disordered manner, with random chain scission giving a mixture of volatile compounds. The result is broadly akin to pyrolysis, although at higher temperatures gasification takes place. These reactions can be seen during waste management, with the products being burnt as synthetic fuel in a waste-to-energy process. In comparison to simply incinerating the starting polymer, depolymerisation gives a material with a higher heating value which can be burnt more efficiently and may also be sold. Incineration can also produce harmful dioxins and dioxin-like compounds and requires specially designed reactors and emission control systems in order to be performed safely. As the depolymerisation step requires heat it is energy-consuming, thus the ultimate balance of energy efficiency compared to straight incineration can be very tight and has been the subject of criticism.

Biomass
Many agricultural and animal wastes can be processed, but these are often already used as fertilizer, animal feed, and, in some cases, as feedstocks for paper mills or as low-quality boiler fuel. Thermal depolymerisation can convert these into more economically valuable materials. Numerous biomass to liquid technologies have been developed. In general, biochemicals contain oxygen atoms which are retained during pyrolysis, giving liquid products rich in phenols and furans. These can be viewed as partially oxidised and make for low-grade fuels. Hydrothermal liquefaction technologies dehydrate the biomass during thermal processing to produce a more energy rich product stream. Similarly, gasification produces hydrogen, a very high energy fuel.

Plastics
Plastic waste consists mostly of commodity plastics and may be actively sorted from municipal waste. Pyrolysis of mixed plastics can give a fairly broad mix of chemical products (between about 1 and 15 carbon atoms) including gases and aromatic liquids. Catalysts can give a better defined product with a higher value. Likewise, hydrocracking can be employed to give LPG products.
The presence of PVC can be problematic, as its thermal depolymerisation generates large amounts of HCl, which can corrode equipment and cause undesirable chlorination of the products. It must be either excluded or compensated for by installing dechlorination technologies.
Polyethylene and polypropylene account for just less than half of global plastic production and being pure hydrocarbons have a higher potential for conversion to fuel. Plastic-to-fuel technologies have historically struggled to be economically viable due to the costs of collecting and sorting the plastic and the relatively low value of the fuel produced. Large plants are seen as being more economical than smaller ones, but require more investment to build.

The approach can however, lead to a mild net-decrease in greenhouse gas emissions, though other studies dispute this.  E.g., a 2020 study released by Renolds on their own Hefty EnergyBag program shows net greenhouse gas emissions. The study showed then when all cradle-to-grave energy costs are tallied, burning in a cement kiln was far superior.  Cement kiln fuel scored a -61.1 kg  equivalents compared to +905 kg  eq.  It also fared far worse in terms of landfill reduction vs. kiln fuel. Other studies have confirmed that plastics pyrolysis to fuel programs are also more energy intensive.

In tire waste management, tire pyrolysis is also an option. Oil derived from tire rubber pyrolysis contains high sulfur content, which gives it high potential as a pollutant and requires hydrodesulfurization before use. The area faces legislative, economic, and marketing obstacles. In most cases tires are simply incinerated as tire-derived fuel.

Municipal waste
Thermal treatment of municipal waste can involve the depolymerisation of a very wide range of compounds, including plastics and biomass. Technologies can include simple incineration as well as pyrolysis, gasification and plasma gasification. All of these are able to accommodate mixed and contaminated feedstocks. The main advantage is the reduction in volume of the waste, particularly in densely populated area lacking suitable sites for new landfills. In many countries incineration with energy recovery remains the most common method, with more advanced technologies being hindered by technical and cost hurdles.

Ordered depolymerisation
Some materials thermally decompose in an ordered manner to give a single or limited range of products. By virtue of being pure materials they are usually more valuable than the mixtures produced by disordered thermal depolymerisation. For plastics this is usually the starting monomer and when this is recycled back into fresh polymer it is called feedstock recycling. In practice, not all depolymerisation reactions are completely efficient and some competitive pyrolysis is often observed.

Biomass
Biorefineries convert low-value agricultural and animal waste into useful chemicals. The industrial production of furfural by the acid catalysed thermal treatment of hemicellulose has been in operation for over a century. Lignin has been the subject of significant research for the potential production of BTX and other aromatics compounds, although such processes have not yet been commercialised with any lasting success.

Plastics

Certain polymers like PTFE, Nylon 6, polystyrene and PMMA undergo depolymerization to give their starting monomers. These can be converted back into new plastic, a process called chemical or feedstock recycling. 
In theory this offers infinite recyclability but it is also more expensive and has a higher carbon footprint than other forms of plastic recycling, however in practice this still yields an inferior product at higher energy costs than virgin polymer production in the real world because of contamination.

Related processes
Although rarely employed today, coal gasification has historically been performed on a large scale. Thermal depolymerisation is similar to other processes which use superheated water as a major step to produce fuels, such as direct hydrothermal liquefaction.
These are distinct from processes using dry materials to depolymerize, such as pyrolysis. The term Thermochemical Conversion (TCC) has also been used for conversion of biomass to oils, using superheated water, although it is more usually applied to fuel production via pyrolysis.
A demonstration plant due to start up in The Netherlands is said to be capable of processing 64 tons of biomass (dry basis) per day into oil.  Thermal depolymerisation differs in that it contains a hydrous process followed by an anhydrous cracking / distillation process.

Condensation polymers baring cleavable groups such as esters and amides can also be completely depolymerised by hydrolysis or solvolysis, this can be a purely chemical process but may also be promoted by enzymes. Such technologies are less well developed than those of thermal depolymerisation but have the potential for lower energy costs. Thus far polyethylene terephthalate has been the most heavily studied polymer. It has been suggested that waste plastic could be converted into other valuable chemicals (not necessarily monomers) by microbial action, such technology is still in its infancy.

See also
Thermal treatment
Mechanical heat treatment
Wet oxidation
Staged reforming

References

Pyrolysis
Energy development
Industrial processes
Biodegradable waste management
Thermal treatment
Petroleum technology
Plastic recycling